Daryl C. "Brick" McNeill Sr. (c. 1960 – October 19, 2013) was an American football player and coach. He served as the head football coach at Johnson C. Smith University from 1995 to 1998 and again from 2005 to 2009. He also served as the head football coach at Savannah State University from 1997 to 1998 and Clark Atlanta University from 2010 to 2012

Head coaching record

References

External links
 

Year of birth missing
2013 deaths
Clark Atlanta Panthers football coaches
Johnson C. Smith Golden Bulls football coaches
Savannah State Tigers football coaches
South Carolina State Bulldogs football players
Players of American football from Augusta, Georgia